Robert Brown (July 31, 1927 – May 1973), who performed as Smoky Babe, was an American acoustic blues guitarist and singer, whose recording career was restricted to a couple of recording sessions in the early 1960s. He has been variously described as a Louisiana blues, Piedmont blues and blues revival musician. His most noteworthy recordings are "Going Downtown Boogie" and "Ain't Got No Rabbit Dog".

Career
Brown was born in Itta Bena, Mississippi. He was recorded by Harry Oster of Louisiana State University in 1960 and 1961, and the results were released by the Folk Lyric, Bluesville and Storyville labels.

Other than his recordings, little is known of his life. The circumstances of his death are unclear. Some sources report that he died in June 1975, but the researchers Bob Eagle and Eric LeBlanc have stated that he probably died in May 1973 in Scotlandville, Baton Rouge, Louisiana.

His song, "Boogy", is included on the compilation album Blues Roots: Give Me the Blues (1979), and "Hottest Brand Goin'" and "Locomotive Blues" are included in the collection The Bluesville Years, Vol. 9: Down the Country Way (1998).

Discography
Smoky Babe and His Friends: Hot Blues (1961), Folk-Lyric, 77 Records, Arhoolie
Hottest Brand Goin''' (1961), Bluesville (Reissued on CD as The Blues of Smokey Babe)
Smoky Babe, Herman E. Johnson, Louisiana Country Blues (1997), Arhoolie Smoky Babe: Way Back in the Country Blues'' (2014), Arhoolie

References

External links
 Smoky Babe recordings at archive.org

1927 births
1973 deaths
People from Itta Bena, Mississippi
Blues musicians from Mississippi
American blues guitarists
American male guitarists
American blues singers
Blues revival musicians
Louisiana blues musicians
Piedmont blues musicians
20th-century American singers
20th-century American guitarists
Singers from Louisiana
Guitarists from Louisiana
Guitarists from Mississippi
20th-century American male singers